Arlington House, Inc. (dba as Arlington House Publishers), now-defunct, was an American book publisher of jazz discographies, as well as conservative and anti-communist titles.  It was a Delaware corporation from 1964 to 1988 with offices in New Rochelle and New York City and, in 1981, Westport, Connecticut.

History of corporate structure 
 In 1968, Computer Applications, Inc. acquired the businesses of Arlington House, Inc., and its affiliated companies, Conservative Book Club, Inc., and Nostalgia Book Club, Inc., all of New Rochelle, for approximately $1.5 million in stock.  The acquired firms continued to operate under then current management as part of the direct mail/graphic arts and publishing division of Computer Applications, Inc. (CAI).
 Arlington House was later acquired by Starr Broadcasting, which was sold to Shamrock Broadcasting in 1979. Shamrock sold Arlington House to Crown Publishing in 1981.

Selected books published

Politics, economics, & conservatism

Arts & entertainment

References

External links 
Arlington House at OpenLibrary
Works by Arlington House at Internet Archive

Defunct publishing companies of the United States
Publishing companies established in 1964
American companies disestablished in 1988
American companies established in 1964